Didier Bocquet is a French electronic music composer and musician who was active in the late 1970s and early 1980s. His primary instrument was the keyboard and he was inspired by German artist Klaus Schulze

Discography
Eclipse (1977) LP
Cerebral Voyage (1978) LP
Sequences (1980) LP Pulse Records
Pictures of Life (1982) LP Pulse Records

References 

French electronic musicians
Living people
Year of birth missing (living people)